Paul Hindemith (1895–1963) was a German composer, violist, violinist, teacher and conductor.

Hindemith also refers to:
 Rudolf Hindemith (1900–1974), German cellist and conductor, brother of Paul
 Maria Landes-Hindemith (1901–1987), pianist, wife of Rudolf
 Harry Hindemith (1906–1973), German actor
 5157 Hindemith, a minor planet

See also
 Hindemith Prize
 Hindemith Prize of the City of Hanau